The San'yō Region (山陽地方 San'yō-chihō) is an area in the south of Honshū, the main island of Japan. It consists of the southern part of the Chūgoku region, facing the Seto Inland Sea. The name San'yō means "southern, sunny (yō) side of the mountains" and contrasts with the San'in or "northern, shady (in) side of the mountains".

The region is generally considered to include the prefectures of Okayama, Hiroshima and Yamaguchi. Sometimes, the section of Hyōgo Prefecture that formerly comprised Harima Province is considered to be within the region as well.

The San'yō encompasses the pre-Meiji provincial areas of Harima, Mimasaka, Bizen, Bitchu, Bingo, Aki, Suō and Nagato.

Transport
The region is served by the San'yō Main Line and Sanyō Shinkansen.

Demographics
The San'in subregion is a subregion of Chūgoku region that composes of the prefectures of Shimane, Tottori, and sometimes the northern portion of Yamaguchi Prefecture. The northern portion of Yamaguchi Prefecture composes of Abu, Hagi, and Nagato. The San'yo subregion is a subregion of  Chūgoku region and is composed of the prefectures of Hiroshima, Okayama, and Yamaguchi in its entirety.

Per Japanese census data, and, San'yo subregion has had positive population growth throughout the 20th century and negative population growth since the beginning of 21st century.

See also
 Gokishichidō
 Tōkaidō
 Tōsandō  
 Hokurikudō  
 San'indō  
 San'yōdō  
 Nankaidō  
 Saikaidō

Notes

References
 Nussbaum, Louis-Frédéric and Käthe Roth. (2005).  Japan encyclopedia. Cambridge: Harvard University Press. ;  OCLC 58053128
 Titsingh, Isaac. (1834). Nihon Odai Ichiran; ou,  Annales des empereurs du Japon.  Paris: Royal Asiatic Society, Oriental Translation Fund of Great Britain and Ireland. OCLC 5850691.

External links
 Japan Guide.com

Regions of Japan
Chūgoku region
Geography of Hiroshima Prefecture
Geography of Okayama Prefecture
Geography of Yamaguchi Prefecture